Mixed Race is Tricky's eighth studio album, released on 27 September 2010. It is his second album released through Domino Records, following 2008's Knowle West Boy.

Mixed Race was recorded in Paris, where Tricky currently lives, and has been described by Domino Records as "his most passionate album to date". Tricky himself has described it as "the most uptempo album I've done". Musically, the album takes influence from UK, Jamaican, US, North African and French music. Guest artists include Franky Riley, Terry Lynn, Bobby Gillespie, Gavin Brooksbank, Hakim Hamadouche, Blackman, and Tricky's youngest brother Marlon Thaws.

"Murder Weapon" was released as the first single on 30 August 2010 and charted in France #76.

Track listing
All tracks written by Adrian Thaws (except 'Murder Weapons' written by Noel Phillips); additional writing credits noted per track.
 "Every Day"
 "UK Jamaican" (Adrian Thaws / Thomas Bangalter / Guy-Manuel de Homem-Christo / Antony Hegarty / Tekomin Williams)
 "Early Bird"
 "Ghetto Stars"
 "Hakim"
 "Come to Me"
 "Murder Weapon"
 "Time to Dance"
 "Really Real"
 "Bristol to London"
 "Friend Went to Jail" (iTunes and Japanese edition bonus track)

References

2010 albums
Tricky (musician) albums
Domino Recording Company albums